is a Japanese manga series by Konkichi. Zettai BL ni Naru Sekai VS Zettai BL ni Naritakunai Otoko is serialized digitally in Pixiv Comic and the manga mobile app Manga Jam since November 7, 2018.

A live-action television drama adaptation was released with its first season on March 27, 2021, and the second on March 20, 2022.

Plot

The protagonist, a plain-looking college student, discovers that he is living in a world where scenarios seen in boys' love stories are common, culminating in his male acquaintances falling in love. However, the protagonist wants to be nothing more than a background character and avoids getting into one of these situations himself, all while commenting on the events unfolding.

Characters

; portrayed by: Atsuhiro Inukai
The unnamed protagonist designates himself as a background character.

; portrayed by: 
Ayato is the protagonist's little brother.

; portrayed by: Akihisa Shiono
Tōjō is Ayato's best friend and, eventually, boyfriend. His main character trait is being "so good-looking that roses appear around him."

Portrayed by: Asahi Ito
Kikuchi is the protagonist's classmate and an original character created for the television drama adaptation.

Portrayed by: Koji Kominami

; portrayed by: 
Yanagi is one of Ayato's friends who has an unrequited crush on him and is thus reluctant to have Tōjō around him. His main character trait is being "cute."

Portrayed by: 
Kuroda is a high school student introduced in chapter 2 who falls in love with Yūki at first sight for not fearing his appearance. His main character trait is being an "delinquent."

Portrayed by: 
Yūki is a high school student introduced in chapter 2 who falls in love with Kuroda at first sight. His main character trait is being an "honor student."

Portrayed by: 
Ryōta is one of the protagonist's friends introduced in chapter 3. His main character traits are being "energetic" and "air-headed."

Portrayed by: 
Tōma is one of the protagonist's friends introduced in chapter 3. His main character trait is being "good-looking."

Portrayed by: Shogo Hama
Akihito is one of the protagonist's classmates introduced in chapter 8. His main character trait is being "easily embarrassed."

Portrayed by: Ryono Kusachi
Takimoto is one of the protagonist's classmates introduced in chapter 8 who worries about Akihito. His main character trait is being "cool."

Portrayed by: Hayate Wada
Mayama is a BL manga artist. His main character trait is being a "", a male fan of BL.

Media

Manga

Zettai BL ni Naru Sekai VS Zettai BL ni Naritakunai Otoko is written and illustrated by Konkichi. It is serialized digitally on Pixiv Comic and the manga mobile app Manga Jam beginning on November 7, 2018. The chapters were later released in three bound volumes by Shodensha under the Feel Comics FC Jam imprint.

Drama CDs

An audio drama CD was released on April 24, 2020, starring Yoshiki Nakajima as the protagonist,  as Ayato, and Takuya Eguchi as Tōjō. The CD was packaged with an 8-page exclusive comic drawn by Konkichi and a character song CD with Nakajima performing as his character. It charted at #44 on the Oricon Weekly Album Rankings upon its first week of release.  A second drama CD is releasing on May 26, 2021, with Hiro Shimono as Yanagi, Nobuhiko Okamoto, Kōhei Amasaki, Tatsuhisa Suzuki, and Wataru Hatano added as additional cast members. The second drama CD contains a 12-page exclusive comic drawn by Konkichi.

Television drama

A live-action television series adaptation February 18, 2021. The series will be airing weekly beginning on March 27, 2021 on CS TV Asahi Channel 1 at 9 PM, with simultaneous international broadcasts in South Korea, Taiwan, Thailand, Vietnam, the Philippines, Hong Kong, and Macao. It is directed by Kōichirō Miki, with Izumi Kawasaki in charge of the scriptwriting and Erina Koyama composing the music. Atsuhiro Inukai stars as the protagonist. The show's theme song is "Bubble Love" by Da-ice, with Da-ice member Hayate Wada making a special appearance in the show. The opening theme song is "Ore wa Mob" performed by the main cast of the drama, credited as "Atsuhiro Inukai with LoveBoys." A second season was broadcast on March 20, 2022, with Kenta Izuka replacing Kominami as a series regular.

Streaming platform Viki licensed the first season in English with a release date of July 23, 2021.

Season 1 (2021)

Season 2 (2022)

Reception

In 2019, A Man Who Defies the World of BL was shortlisted at #11 at the Next Manga Awards in the Web category held by the magazine Da Vinci. It was ranked at #4 at Pixiv and Nippon Shuppan Hanbai's Web Manga General Election.

Notes

References

External links 

  of the TV drama 

2018 manga
2021 Japanese television series debuts
Japanese boys' love television series
Japanese television dramas based on manga
Josei manga
Shodensha manga
Yaoi anime and manga
2020s Japanese LGBT-related television series